The Sacrament Act 1547 is an Act of the Parliament of England.

This Act was partly in force in Great Britain at the end of 2010.

The whole Act, so far as unrepealed, except section 8, was repealed by section 1 of, and Part II of the Schedule to, the Statute Law (Repeals) Act 1969.

Section 1
In this section, the words from "from and after" to "nexte cominge" were repealed by section 1 of, and Schedule 1 to, the Statute Law Revision Act 1948.

Section 2
In this section, the words to "Maie next coming" and "whereof one of them to be of the quorum" and the words "after the saide first daie of Maye" were repealed by section 1 of, and Schedule 1 to, the Statute Law Revision Act 1948.

This section was repealed by section 10(2) of, and Part I of Schedule 3 to, the Criminal Law Act 1967.

Section 3
This section was repealed by section 10(3) of, and Part II of Schedule 2 to, the Criminal Procedure (Attendance of Witnesses) Act 1965.

Section 4
This section was repealed by section 10(2) of, and Part I of Schedule 3 to, the Criminal Law Act 1967.

Section 5
This section was repealed by section 10(2) of, and Part I of Schedule 3 to, the Criminal Law Act 1967.

Section 6 
This section was repealed by section 1 of, and Part II of the Schedule to, the Statute Law (Repeals) Act 1969.

Section 7
This section was repealed by section 10(2) of, and Part I of Schedule 3 to, the Criminal Law Act 1967.

Section 8
Primitive Mode of receiving the Sacrament; The Sacrament shall be administered in both Kinds, Bread and Wine, to the People: After Exhortations of the Priest, the Sacrament shall not be denied. Not condemning the Usage of other Churches

This section, in so far as it extended to Northern Ireland, was repealed by section 1 of, and Schedule 1 to, the Statute Law Revision Act 1953.

References
Halsbury's Statutes

External links
The Sacrament Act 1547, as amended, from Legislation.gov.uk.

Acts of the Parliament of England (1485–1603)
1547 in law
1547 in England
Acts of the Parliament of England concerning religion
1547 in Christianity